Maar is a common type of volcanic crater.

Maar or MAAR may also refer to:

 Maar (album), an album by Evpatoria Report
 Maar (surname), list of people with the surname
"Maar", meaning "people" in some Aboriginal Australian languages, as in the Eastern Maar, a group of Aboriginal peoples in Victoria, Australia
 Madzhakandila Anti-Aircraft Regiment, an artillery regiment of the South African Army

See also
Maar Dibsah, a Syrian village
Maar Hattat, a Syrian village
Maar Shamshah, a Syrian village
Maar Shuhur, a Syrian village
Maar Tamater, a Syrian village
 Modular Advanced Armed Robotic System (MAARS), a military robot
Pocket Maar (1956 film), a Hindi film
 Pocket Maar (1974 film), another Hindi film